Tārgale Parish is an administrative unit of the Ventspils Municipality in the Courland region of Latvia.The parish has a population of 1956 (as of 1/07/2010) and covers an area of 364.19 km2.

Villages of Tārgale Parish

Notable natives 
 Alīda Vāne (1899-1969), opera singer

Parishes of Latvia
Ventspils Municipality
Courland